Ellen Coleman (born 11 December 1995) is a Ghanaian footballer who plays as a defender for the Ghana women's national team.

Club career
Coleman has played for Lady Strikers in Ghana.

International career
Coleman was on the Ghana squad at the 2018 Africa Women Cup of Nations but did not appear in any matches.

References

1995 births
Living people
Ghanaian women's footballers
Women's association football defenders
Ghana women's international footballers
Lady Strikers F.C. players